The  ("Book of the Composition of Alchemy"), also known as the  ("Testament of Morienus"), the , or by its Arabic title  ("Khalid's Questions to the Monk Maryanos"), is a work on alchemy falsely attributed to the Umayyad prince Khalid ibn Yazid. It is generally considered to be the first  Latin translation of an Arabic work on alchemy into Latin, completed on 11 February 1144 by the English Arabist Robert of Chester.

Widely popular among later alchemists, the work is extant in many manuscripts and has been printed and translated into vernacular languages several times since the sixteenth century.

Arabic text

The Latin translation is for the most part based on an Arabic source, though both the Arabic  and the Latin  contain sections not present in the other. The Arabic text belongs to the alchemical works associated with Khalid ibn Yazid, which are widely regarded as ninth- or tenth-century forgeries, although it has also been argued that some of them may go back to the eighth century. Since one manuscript of the  contains a citation from the early tenth-century work  ("Book of Life") attributed to Ibn Umayl, the work may have been originally written in the latter half of the tenth century.

Latin text 

The word  in the Latin title does not yet refer to the art of alchemy, but rather to the mysterious material which alchemists claimed could transmute one substance into another (i.e., the elixir or philosophers' stone). The actual meaning of the Latin title is thus "the book on the composition of the elixir". As the Latin translator states in his preface:

This book styles itself the composition of alchemy. And as your Latin world does not yet know what alchemy is and what its composition is, I will clarify it in the present text. [...] The philosopher Hermes and his successors defined this word as follows, for instance in the book of the mutation of substances: alchemy is a material substance taken from one and composed by one, joining between them the most precious substances by affinity and effect, and by the same natural mixture, naturally transforming them into better substances.

The author of the Latin preface appears to have had access to other translated sources, among them texts attributed to Hermes Trismegistus. The emphasis on the alchemical elixir being "taken from one and composed by one" may be a reference to the short and cryptic Hermetic text known as the Emerald Tablet, which mentions that "the performance of wonders stems from one, just as all things stem from one substance according to a single procedure".

Notes

References

Bibliography

Primary sources
 (same content also available online) (partial edition  of the Arabic text with English translation)
 (edition and French translation of the Arabic text; edition and French translation of two versions of the Latin text; study and commentary)
 (edition of the Latin text)
 (edition of the Latin text with English translation)

Secondary sources
 (contains a systematic comparison of the Arabic and the Latin text)

 (see index p. 521, s.v. ; bibliography and summary content on pp. 461–462)

 (survey of all Latin alchemical texts known to have been translated from the Arabic)

Alchemical works of the medieval Islamic world